The Singapore Open can refer to several sporting events bearing the same name, or at least in part:

Singapore Open (badminton)
Singapore Open (bowling)
Singapore Open (darts)
Singapore Open (golf)
Singapore Open (table tennis)
The Singapore Open Scrabble Championship 
 The Singapore Open (men's tennis), a men's tennis tournament held from 1989 to 1993 and again from 1996 to 1999
 2021 Singapore Tennis Open
 The WTA Singapore Open, a women's tennis tournament held from 1986 to 1990 and again in 1994